Ithaca is one of the regional units of Greece. It is part of the region of the Ionian Islands. The capital of the regional unit is the town of Vathy. The regional unit consists of the islands of Ithaca, Atokos, Arkoudi, Oxeia, Drakonera and several smaller islands, all in the Ionian Sea. It has one municipality, Ithaca.

In 2011, as part of the Kallikratis plan, the previous prefecture of Cephalonia was divided into the regional units of Cephalonia and Ithaca.

References

 
2011 establishments in Greece
States and territories established in 2011
Regional units of the Ionian Islands (region)